Elis William Watts (born 28 June 2002) is a Welsh professional footballer who plays as a midfielder for Weston-super-Mare.

Career

Newport County
Watts played for Cambrian & Clydach and Cardiff City Academy before joining the Newport County Academy in 2014. On 4 September 2019, Watts made his debut for Newport in the starting line up for the 5–4 defeat to West Ham United Under-21s in the EFL Trophy Southern Group E. On 18 January 2020,  Watts joined Bristol Manor Farm on loan until the end of the 2019–20 season.

Watts was released by Newport County at the end of the 2019–20 season.

Aldershot Town
Having joined Aldershot Town following his release from Newport, Watts was promoted to the club's first-team set up on a full time basis in May 2021. Watts spent time on loan at Metropolitan Police in October 2020, featuring twice for their under-23 side, scoring twice. He made his Aldershot debut on the opening day of the 2021–22 season, coming on as a 90th minute substitute in a 2–0 home defeat to Chesterfield.

On 15 October 2021, Watts joined Farnborough on loan until January 2022, scoring on his debut a day later, during their 4–0 victory over Kings Langley. He went onto feature ten times in all competitions, scoring three goals before being recalled by Aldershot towards the end of 2021. On 5 January 2022, Watts joined Hayes & Yeading United on an initial one-month loan deal. Watts featured twelve times, scoring once for the club before returning to Aldershot and immediately joining Weston-super-Mare on loan for the remainder of the campaign.

On 16 May 2022, Watts announced via Twitter that he would be leaving the club at the end of his contract.

Weston-super-Mare
On 16 July 2022, Watts returned to Weston-super-Mare on a permanent basis having spent time on loan with the club the previous season after a successful pre-season.

Career Statistics

References

External links 

2002 births
Living people
Footballers from Pontypridd
Welsh footballers
Association football midfielders
Newport County A.F.C. players
Bristol Manor Farm F.C. players
Aldershot Town F.C. players
Farnborough F.C. players
Hayes & Yeading United F.C. players
Weston-super-Mare A.F.C. players
Southern Football League players
National League (English football) players